Ray Thomas (December 11, 1917 – December 8, 1985) was a Canadian judge and politician.

Born in Mirror, Alberta, he was elected to the House of Commons of Canada in the riding of Wetaskiwin in the 1949 federal election. A Social Credit Party member, he was re-elected in the 1953 and 1957 elections. He was defeated in the 1958 election. In 1959, he was appointed a provincial court judge.

References

External links
 

1917 births
1985 deaths
Canadian military personnel of World War II
Members of the House of Commons of Canada from Alberta
Social Credit Party of Canada MPs